South Carolina Highway 41 (SC 41) is a  state highway, connecting the Charleston region with eastern portions of the Pee Dee region in South Carolina.  It serves as an alternative route to U.S. Route 52.

Route description
The route travels generally in a south-north direction, beginning in Mount Pleasant and ending at the North Carolina state line just north of Lake View, where it continues as North Carolina Highway 41 towards Lumberton.  The route is mostly rural, though it serves as an important arterial in suburban Mount Pleasant and passes through several small towns on its route northwards.  It also provides several key river and swamp crossings in the Pee Dee region.

History
The current SC 41 was established in 1938 on a path from Lake View northeast to the North Carolina state line, where it replaced the original SC 94. In 1940, the two segments were connected, and the highway was extended to what was then US 76 in Marion. Between 1944 and 1947, SC 41 was re-routed slightly within both Fork and Lake View. In 1949, its southern terminus was shifted to the northwest in Marion, to then end at what was then part of US 501 (now is US 501 Bus.). In September 1951, its path was re-routed in Fork to replace SC 57 to Centenary, SC 175 to Hemingway, and SC 511 to Mount Pleasant. Its former path from Centenary to Fork was redesignated as SC 41 Alt. In 1970, the highway was shifted off of the bypass around Andrews and was routed through the town. Approximately 25 years later, it was put back on the Andrews bypass; its former path was redesignated as SC 41 Bus.

South Carolina Highway 41 (1920s)

South Carolina Highway 41 (SC 41) was an original state highway that was established in 1922 from SC 2 (now U.S. Route 78 (US 78)) near Goose Creek, through Moncks Corner, Kingstree, Lake City, Florence, and Darlington, and ended at SC 50 south-southwest of Cheraw. Approximately three years later, its path from St. Stephen to Kingstree was shifted to the west. Between St. Stephen and Pineville, this replaced the original SC 45 corridor. The former path between Gourdin and Lane was redesignated as SC 412, part of SC 44, and abandoned roadway across the Santee River. In 1927, US 17 was designated along SC 41 from Goose Creek to Florence and US 601 from Florence to the Cheraw area. The next year, the state highway was decommissioned. Most of its path is approximately equal today as US 52.

South Carolina Highway 41 (1930s)

South Carolina Highway 41 (SC 41) was a state highway that was established in either 1934 or 1935 from U.S. Route 301 (US 301) west-northwest of the community of New Zion east-southeast to the community. In 1938, it was decommissioned and redesignated as SC 94. Its path is known today as Salem Road.

Future
The Wando River Bridge, a through truss swing bridge built in 1939, was replaced by 2020-2021.  The new bridge will be four-lane with median (which can be used as a fifth lane during emergencies), and will be a fixed span bridge, tall enough for tall ships to pass.  At a planned cost of $42.3 million, construction began in mid-2015.

Junction list

Special routes

Andrews business loop

Established between 1993-1996, it replaced mainline SC 41 through downtown Andrews.  This is second business loop through Andrew, following exactly the same route from 1960-63 until 1970.

Marion alternate route

South Carolina Highway 41 Alternate (SC 41 Alt.) is a  alternate route that exists west of the SC 41 mainline path. It connects Centenary and Fork, via Marion, while the mainline travels through Mullins in this area.

Established in 1951 or 1952 as a new alternate route of SC 41 through Marion, though it did replace part of SC 175 south of Marion.

See also

References

External links

 
 Mapmikey's South Carolina Highways Page: SC 41

041
Transportation in Charleston County, South Carolina
Transportation in Berkeley County, South Carolina
Transportation in Georgetown County, South Carolina
Transportation in Williamsburg County, South Carolina
Transportation in Florence County, South Carolina
Transportation in Marion County, South Carolina
Transportation in Dillon County, South Carolina